John Gordon Ross (11 October 1891 – 7 September 1972) was a Liberal party member of the House of Commons of Canada. He was born in Moose Jaw, Northwest Territories (now Saskatchewan), whose career included farming and ranching.

Ross, the son of Senator James Hamilton Ross, attended St. Andrew's College in Toronto, then Macdonald Agricultural College at Sainte-Anne-de-Bellevue, Quebec.

He was first elected to Parliament at the Moose Jaw riding in the 1925 general election and re-elected there in 1926. In the 1930 election, he was defeated by William Addison Beynon of the Conservative party. In the 1935 election, Ross won back the riding from Beynon and was re-elected in 1940. In 1945, Ross was defeated by Ross Thatcher of the Co-operative Commonwealth Federation.

References

External links
 
  Speech by J. Gordon Ross to the Empire Club on 2 November 1944.

1891 births
1972 deaths
Farmers from Saskatchewan
Members of the House of Commons of Canada from Saskatchewan
Liberal Party of Canada MPs
People from Moose Jaw